The angulate tortoise (Chersina angulata) is a species of tortoise found in dry areas and coastal scrub vegetation in South Africa. This tortoise is the only known member of the genus Chersina.

Name and taxonomy
This species is highly distinctive and is now classified by itself, in the monotypic Chersina genus. While it differs considerably from all other tortoise species, its closest relatives, according to phylogenetic studies, are the tiny "padloper" (Homopus) tortoise species, with which it shares its southern African habitat.

Internationally it is known by the two names of "angulate" and "bowsprit" tortoise. Locally in southern Africa however, it is uniformly known as the "angulate" tortoise in English, and as the rooipens skilpad ("red-belly tortoise") in Afrikaans.

Description

Identification
A small, shy tortoise with a relatively variable shell, they can often be distinguished by their prominent "bowsprits", which are protrusions of the "gular" shields, from their plastrons under their chins. 
These are used by males to fight for territory or females. Uniquely, this species has only one gular shield under its chin; all other southern African tortoises have a divided/double scaled gular. Angulate specimens have five claws on their front legs and four on each back leg. They also, like most other southern African tortoises, have a nuchal scute.

Regional variation
There is considerable regional variation in this species of tortoise. Angulates from the west coast of southern Africa tend to have a reddish colour, especially on the underside of their shell (from where their Afrikaans name of rooipens or "red-belly" comes). Inland specimens from the Karoo region are often darker, and some are known to be uniformly black. To the east of their range, individuals are typically smaller and have a lighter colour. Such tendencies can be diluted by admixture however, and in all populations individuals tend to assume a uniform brown colour in old age.

Sexual dimorphism
This species shows considerable difference between male and female individuals. 
The male angulates tend to be larger, to have concave bellies, and to have a longer, thinner, "peanut" shape. They also have enlarged and extended gular scutes under their chins, which they use for sparring with each other. 
The females tend to be smaller and rounder, with a flat or slightly convex belly.

Natural range and threats

Their natural habitat is the fynbos, karoo, albany thickets and coastal scrub (strandveld) vegetation of the south-western part of South Africa. This is an area of semi-arid and Mediterranean climate, with winter rainfall. Within this climatic range however, the angulate tortoise is a tough and very adaptable species.

Geographically, this natural range extends across the Cape Floristic Region, as far north as the southern part of Namibia. In addition, small colonies have been introduced by tourists to domestic gardens in Swakopmund and Walvis Bay, even further north, in central Namibia. To the east, its range extends along the Cape's southern coast as far as East London. 
There is also an especially dense colony on Dassen Island, off the South African coast. 
Throughout its range, this tortoise usually occurs in the greatest numbers near the coast. Inland it occurs at lesser densities, though smaller populations are even found in parts of the Karoo.

Within its natural range, the natural predators of the species include mongoose, jackals, badgers, baboons and predatory birds which attack the infants. Perhaps the largest killers of this species in its natural habitat are the periodic wildfires, which can kill hundreds of thousands at a time.

Due to human activity, it is also increasingly threatened by habitat destruction from agriculture and other development, as well as illegal collecting for the pet trade and deaths from tortoises crossing busy roads. 
Human introduced species such as the pied crow kill thousands of infants every year, especially along the West Coast where this invasive species is rapidly spreading.

Human interaction and captivity

The angulate tortoise is commonly kept as a garden pet in South Africa. However the species is classified as "Protected Wild Animal" in the Nature Conservation Ordinance No. 19 (2000), and it is therefore strictly illegal to remove this animal from the wild. It may also not be transported, possessed, imported or exported without a permit.

A commonly reported problem is that, when a tortoise is spotted crossing rural roads, drivers tend to stop, pick it up and take it home - away from its habitat in the wild. This is illegal and traumatic for the tortoise. Instead drivers are encouraged to stop and, if they wish, assist it crossing the road in the direction that it was going.

Nonetheless, there is a legal and regulated pet trade in this tortoise, especially for captive-bred specimens. However it is absolutely imperative to attain a permit when buying, selling or keeping this species.

Diet

If kept in a garden, these tortoises need a sizable warm, sunny, dry, well-drained area, with a diverse range of possible plant foods.

They naturally eat a wide variety of indigenous South African plants and, if kept in a garden, they require a similarly wide range of edible plants available, on which to feed. They will not stay healthy if fed only one food type, such as lettuce.

Plants marked with * are most important to diet.

Grasses as for leopard tortoises: 
Couch grass (Cynodon dactylon)
Eastern Province vlei grass (Eragrostis lehmanniana)
Dew grass (Eragrostis pseudo-obtusa)
Bushman grass (Schmidtia kalahariensis)
Carrot grass (Tragus racemosus)
Beesgras (Urochloa pantcoides)
Veld grass (Ehrhartacalycina)
Darnel rye grass (Lolium temulentum)
Barnyard grass (Echinochloa crus-galli)
Mouse barley grass (Hordeum murinum)
Crab finger grass (Digitaria sanguinalis)
Dallas grass (Paspalum dilatatum)
Wintergrass (Poa annua)
Dropseed grass (Sporobolus africanus)
Kikiyu grass (Pennisetum clandestinum)
Buffalo grass (Stenotaphrum secondatum)
Swazi grass (Digitaria swazilandensis)
Alfalfa (Lucerne)

Weeds: (* are most important)  
Plantago major (Broad leafed plantain)* 
Plantago lanceolata ( Buckhorn, narrow leafed plantain)*
Taraxacum officinale (Dandelion most important)* 
Cnicus benedictus (Thistle)
Galinsoga parviflora (Small flowered quickweed)
Opuntia (most types)* 
Rubus cuneifolius (Sand bramble) 
Paperthorn
Tribulis terrestris (common dubbeltjie)*
Arctotheca calendula (Cape marigold)
Trifolium repens (white clover) Note: becomes toxic when dry. 
Cerastium capensi (Cape chickweed)*
Silybum marianum (Blessed milk thistle)
Commelina benghalensis (indigenous wandering Jew)*
Clover*

Unsuitable plants high in oxalates: 
Sedum morganianum
Sedum frutescens
Aracea (arum lily)
Amaranthus (pigweed)
Begonia spp
Oxalis spp
Rheum rhabarbarum (rhubarb)
Crassulae spp 
The Chenopodiacea family which includes beet greens, spinach and chard should be avoided as they contain oxalates.

Domestic dangers

If the garden is suburban, then it should be securely walled, so that the tortoise does not wander into the nearby streets and traffic. 
The property should also not have a swimming pool, as angulate tortoises cannot swim (unlike many larger tortoise species), and will drown if it falls into deep water. 
Domestic dogs are a threat to captive tortoises, which are often badly injured or killed after being severely chewed on. 
If kept in groups, females never clash, however males are fiercely territorial and will fight each other at any opportunity. Males should therefore ideally be kept separately from other males.

Sun and temperature
This tortoise, like most reptiles, also needs to be able to regulate its own temperature, by moving between sunny and shady spots. It therefore needs a large garden where it can move about, so as to seek both natural sunlight, as well as shade, when necessary. It needs a dry habitat, as constant moisture is particularly bad for it.

Illegal trade and exports
Like many species of tortoises, the angulate is increasingly threatened by illegal collecting for the pet trade.  When transported outside of their natural range and climate, these tortoises usually die. This is partly because they are adapted to the warm, dry, Mediterranean-type climate of the Cape, but also because they require a wide range of plant foods, which they typically do not receive when they are kept as pets by inexperienced keepers.

Internationally, the species is regulated by the CITES, or Convention on the International Trade in Endangered Species of Fauna and Flora (Appendix II), as well as other legislation on their international trade.

References

 
at Honoluluzoo.org

Chelonia.org

Chersina
Turtles of Africa
Reptiles of Namibia
Reptiles of South Africa
Reptiles described in 1812